The 1930 LSU Tigers football team was an American football team that represented Louisiana State University (LSU) as a member of the Southern Conference during the 1930 college football season. In their third season under head coach Russ Cohen, LSU compiled a 6–4 record.

Schedule

References

LSU
LSU Tigers football seasons
LSU Tigers football